Apinisia graminicola is a species of fungus. It has been observed as the cause of a leaf disease in Miscanthus × giganteus, a common energy crop.

References 

Onygenales
Fungi described in 1968